Flatiron Construction Corporation, a subsidiary of Hochtief, is a heavy civil infrastructure contractor headquartered in Broomfield, Colorado in U.S.  Flatiron builds infrastructure such as bridges, highways, railways, roads, tunnels, hydropower facilities, oil, gas and industrial infrastructure for the transportation, energy and water sectors, specializing in large-scale infrastructure projects. The company conducts projects through contracting methods such as design-build and public-private partnerships.

Named after the flatiron rock formations found near Boulder, Colorado, Flatiron was originally a small materials company and is now an infrastructure contractor serving North America. This growth began in the late 1980s, when the company conducted work along Interstate 70 (I-70) through the Glenwood Canyon Corridor in Colorado.

Flatiron added new markets in the years that followed. In 1997, Flatiron worked on the first design-build bridge project in Maine, the Sagadahoc Bridge in Bath. Flatiron opened two regional offices in California in the 1990s. In 1998, Flatiron secured a contract for the Eastern Toll Road project. From 1999 to 2004, Flatiron worked on projects in Florida, Texas, Louisiana and the Carolinas, such as the Carolina Bays Parkway project.

In 2005, Flatiron expanded into Western Canada, and secured the company's first public-private partnership project, the Park Bridge east of Golden, British Columbia. Flatiron completed the Carquinez Bridge project in 2007. In 2008, Flatiron secured the Port Mann Bridge/Highway 1 project in Vancouver, British Columbia. That year the company also completed the I-35 W Saint Anthony Falls Bridge project in Minneapolis, which was built following the collapse of the original bridge in August 2007.

Flatiron added work in Utah in 2009, and secured the company's first project in Canada's Saskatchewan province in 2010, Circle Drive. Flatiron has worked on other large infrastructure projects in recent years, including the John James Audubon Bridge over the Mississippi River, sections of the Anthony Henday Drive project in Edmonton, Alberta, the Lake Champlain Bridge connecting New York and Vermont and the Yadkin River Bridges in North Carolina. Flatiron has also worked on several contracts on the new eastern span of the San Francisco–Oakland Bay Bridge.

Flatiron now operates across the U.S. and Canada, has more than 2,000 employees and 12 regional offices in the U.S. and Canada. Flatiron has completed projects in every region of the United States. Flatiron also provides heavy civil construction services in the northeast via E.E. Cruz and Company. The company is a subsidiary of Flatiron and sister company Turner Construction.

Flatiron is part of Dragados led team that is bidding for the different construction packages for the California High Speed rail. Although losing the bid for the first Construction package, they won the second with the contract announced on the 12 December 2014. Dragados/Flatiron/Shimmick submitted a bid of $1.23 billion to design and build the 65-mile stretch from the south end of Fresno to near the Tulare-Kings county line and was deemed the “apparent best value” bidder by the California High-Speed Rail Authority.

References

External links 
Official site

Companies based in Colorado
Construction and civil engineering companies of the United States